Cambridge American Cemetery and Memorial is a World War II American military war grave cemetery, located between the villages of Coton and Madingley,  north-west of Cambridge, England. Cambridge American Cemetery is one of 26 overseas military cemeteries administered by the American Battle Monuments Commission (ABMC).

The memorial is listed Grade II* on the National Heritage List for England.

The cemetery
The University of Cambridge donated 30.5 acres of land on the north slope of Madingley Hill to the American military forces for use as a temporary cemetery during World War II in 1943.  Following the war, the American Battle Monuments Commission selected Cambridge as the site for America's permanent World War II cemetery and war memorial in the United Kingdom.  America's war dead from three temporary cemeteries in the British Isles were consolidated into the Cambridge cemetery during an extensive cemetery construction project, and simultaneously the US Government repatriated approximately 58% of the existing war dead at the request of the surviving family members.  Cambridge American Cemetery and Memorial was dedicated on 16 July 1956.

The cemetery contains 3,809 headstones, with the remains of 3,812 servicemen, including airmen who died over Europe and sailors from North Atlantic convoys. The inscribed Wall of the Missing includes four representative statues of servicemen, sculpted by American artist Wheeler Williams. The wall records the names of 5,127 missing servicemen, most of whom died in the Battle of the Atlantic or in the strategic air bombardment of northwest Europe.

Besides personnel of the United States armed forces there are also buried 18 members of the British Commonwealth armed services, who were American citizens serving chiefly in the Royal Air Force and Air Transport Auxiliary, besides an officer of the Royal Canadian Air Force and another of the British Royal Armoured Corps, whose graves are registered and maintained by the Commonwealth War Graves Commission.

In May 2014, a new visitor centre opened, containing exhibits about some of those individuals interred or remembered at the cemetery, and the wider World War II campaigns in which they were involved.

Notable burials and memorials

 John Martin Howard (1917–1942), US Navy officer – (memorial – buried at sea)
 John Joseph Seerley Jr. (1897–1943), pilot in both World War One and World War Two
 Vincent F. Harrington (1903–1943), US Representative and US Army Air Forces officer
 Glenn Miller (1904–1944), jazz bandleader and trombonist (memorial – lost at sea)
 Damon Jesse Gause (1915–1944), fighter pilot
 Joseph P. Kennedy Jr. (1915–1944), eldest son of Joseph P. Kennedy Sr. and Rose Fitzgerald (memorial – lost at sea)
 Leon Vance (1916–1944), US Army Air Forces pilot and Medal of Honor recipient (memorial – lost at sea)
 Three of the crew of USAAF B-17 Flying Fortress Mi Amigo, which crashed in Sheffield, killing all 10 crew (seven later repatriated to the US)

The memorial (including chapel)
The memorial is separated into a large museum room with a small chapel at the far end from the doors. A great map on the wall shows schematically the air sorties flown from East Anglia, together with convoys across the North Atlantic and other actions in the war. The wall and roof has a mosaic of angels and ghostly aircraft. The south wall is inset with stained glass windows displaying the seals of the States of the Union arranged in ceremonial order.

The chapel was designed and built between 1952 and 1954 by the Boston based architects Perry, Shaw, Hepburn, Kehoe and Dean. Hughes and Bicknell of Cambridge were the executant architects.

Design
The architects of the site plan were Perry, Shaw, Hepburn and Dean, while the landscape architecture was arranged by the Olmsted Brothers company.

Chapel gallery

References

Further reading

External links

 
 
 UK Airfields : Cambridge American Memorial, Madingley

1943 establishments in England
1956 establishments in England
American Battle Monuments Commission
Cemeteries in Cambridgeshire
Commonwealth War Graves Commission cemeteries in England
Grade II* listed buildings in Cambridgeshire
Monuments and memorials in Cambridgeshire
South Cambridgeshire District
United Kingdom–United States military relations
World War II cemeteries in the United Kingdom
World War II memorials in England